John S. Davies (born June 29, 1953) is an American actor, director, and teacher of college level actors.

Early life
Davies was born in Regensburg, Germany, the son of lifelong American diplomat Richard Townsend Davies, who was appointed U.S. Ambassador to Poland in the Nixon Administration. He grew up in American embassies all over the world as well as in and around Washington, D.C. In 1978 he graduated from San Jose State University with a bachelor's degree in theatre. From there he moved to Dallas where he attended the Dallas Theater Center being awarded a Master of Fine Arts in June 1982.

Career
His professional career included over 60 theatre performances as well as directing many others. His better known television and film work includes RoboCop (1987), JFK, (1991), Walker Texas Ranger, Rough Riders (1997), The Alamo (2004), Prison Break, and the direct to video sequel of Walking Tall, Walking Tall: The Payback.

Filmography

External links
 

1953 births
American male film actors
American male television actors
Living people